Xylota chalcopyga is a species of hoverfly in the family Syrphidae.

Distribution
it is distributed on the island of Java.

References

Eristalinae
Insects described in 1978
Diptera of Asia